Ullinjas is a village in the former municipality of Otllak in Berat County, Albania. At the 2015 local government reform it became part of the municipality Berat.

It was formerly known as Virjon, or Virion from where the Vrioni family derived its name.

References

Populated places in Berat
Vrioni family
Villages in Berat County